DeFeo is a surname. Notable people with the surname include:

 Jay DeFeo (1929–1989), American artist
 Peter DeFeo (1902–1993), American mobster
 Ronald DeFeo Jr. (1951–2021), American mass murderer
 Ubi de Feo (born 1974), Italian educator
 Vincenzo De Feo (1876–1955), Italian admiral